Kate McNeil (born August 17, 1959) is an American actress. She starred in the CBS daytime soap opera As the World Turns from 1981 to 1984, and in 1983 had the leading role in the slasher film The House on Sorority Row. McNeil was also the female lead in the 1988 horror film Monkey Shines.

Early years
The daughter of the president of U.S. Cocoa Corporation, McNeil grew up in a suburb of Philadelphia, Pennsylvania. In high school, she said, "I was in a lot of plays, and I was a bit wild." She went on to study theater at Ithaca College.

Career
McNeil began her acting career on the soap opera As the World Turns in 1981. In 1982, she appeared in the low-budget comedy Beach House. The following year, she starred in the slasher film The House on Sorority Row.  1985 saw Kate McNeil appearing in the miniseries Kane & Abel and in 1986 she was featured in another miniseries, North and South Book II. She co-starred in director George A. Romero's horror film Monkey Shines in 1988. In the 1990s, Kate McNeil appeared as Janet Gilchrist in the final three Waltons TV movies.

In the early 1990s, McNeil was a cast member of two television shows, WIOU and Bodies of Evidence. McNeil has also made numerous television guest appearances. She has appeared on Amazing Stories, Simon & Simon, Designing Women, Midnight Caller, Quantum Leap, The X-Files, Murder, She Wrote, Babylon 5, Diagnosis Murder, Veronica Mars, Bones, The Mentalist, and Mad Men.

Personal life
McNeil has been married to Roy Friedland, a director and script writer, since 1987. They have two children.

Filmography

Film

Television

References

External links

American film actresses
American television actresses
Actresses from Philadelphia
Actresses from Pennsylvania
1959 births
Living people
21st-century American women